The 12487 / 12488 Seemanchal Express is a Superfast train belonging to Northern Railway zone that runs between  and  in India. It is currently being operated with 12487/12488 train numbers on a daily basis.

Service

The 12487/Seemanchal Express has an average speed of 55 km/hr and covers 1397 km in 24h 55m. The 12488/Seemanchal Express has an average speed of 55 km/hr and covers 1397 km in 24h 55m.

Route & Halts

The important halts of the train are:

Coach composition

The train has modern LHB rakes with max speed of 110 kmph. The train consists of 22 coaches:

 1 Second Tier AC
 3 Third Tier AC
 1 Third Tier AC Economy
 9 Sleeper Class
 6 General Unreserved
 1 Seating cum Luggage Rake
 1 EOG

Traction

From Katihar Junction the train is hauled by a Ghaziabad-based WAP-7 electric locomotive and vice versa.

Incident
On February 3, 2019, at 3:58 a.m IST, the Delhi-bound Seemanchal Express train derailed at Hajipur in Bihar. This led to the derailment of one general coach, one A.C three tier coach, three sleeper coaches and four more coaches. At least six people died and several people were injured. Later the East Central railway officials found that it was caused due to a rail fracture.

See also 

 Jogbani railway station
 Anand Vihar Terminal railway station
 Kolkata–Jogbani Express

Notes

References

External links 

 12487/Seemanchal Express India Rail Info
 12488/Seemanchal Express India Rail Info

Transport in Delhi
Express trains in India
Rail transport in Bihar
Rail transport in Uttar Pradesh
Rail transport in Delhi
Railway services introduced in 2009
Named passenger trains of India